Saadia Himi (born February 8, 1984 in Nijmegen) is a model and a beauty queen from the Netherlands. Himi won the Miss Netherlands Earth 2004 beauty pageant and went on to represent the Netherlands in the Miss Earth 2004 pageant held in Quezon City, Philippines.

References

Dutch female models
Miss Earth 2004 contestants
Dutch people of Moroccan descent
Living people
1984 births
People from Nijmegen
Dutch beauty pageant winners